Asra Quratulain Nomani (born September 7, 1965) is a conservative American author and former Georgetown University professor. Born in India to Muslim parents, she earned a BA from West Virginia University in liberal arts in 1986 and an MA from the American University in international communications in 1990. She subsequently worked as a correspondent for The Wall Street Journal with her colleague Daniel Pearl in Pakistan post-9/11. Pearl was kidnapped and murdered by Islamist terrorists while following an investigative lead. Nomani later became the co-director of the Pearl Project, a faculty-student investigative-reporting project which has looked into Pearl's murder.

Nomani is the author of three books: Standing Alone: An American Woman's Struggle for the Soul of Islam, Tantrika: Traveling the Road of Divine Love, and Woke Army, the Red-Green Alliance that is Destroying America's Freedom. Articles include: "Islamic Bill of Rights for Women in the Bedroom", the "Islamic Bill of Rights for Women in the Mosque", and "99 Precepts for Opening Hearts, Minds and Doors in the Muslim World". She has also written for The Washington Post and has been a returning guest on Real Time with Bill Maher. Her story forms part of the documentary The Mosque in Morgantown, aired nationwide on PBS as part of the series America at a Crossroads.

She is currently a senior contributor to The Federalist. Nomani has described herself as an advocate of Islamic feminism and a critic of Islamism.

Early life

Nomani was born in Bombay (now Mumbai), India, to parents following Sunni Islam. Her mother Sajida Nomani (–) and father Mohammad Zafar Alam Nomani (born 1935–), an Indian nutritionist, were both born in colonial India. Her father was born in Hyderabad, India where he eared an MSc from the Osmania University, later serving as an assistant professor at the university till 1967. When she was four years old, she moved to the United States with her older brother to join their parents in New Brunswick, New Jersey where her father, was earning a PhD at Rutgers University. When Nomani was ten, her family moved to Morgantown, West Virginia, where her father became an assistant professor (later professor) of nutrition at West Virginia University. Her father (cited as M.Z.A. Nomani) published studies on the health effects of fasting during Ramadan and also helped organize mosques in both New Jersey and West Virginia. Asra Nomani received a Bachelor of Arts degree in liberal studies from West Virginia University in 1986 and a Master of Arts from American University in international communications in 1990. She has one son.

Career
Nomani is a former The Wall Street Journal correspondent and has written for The Washington Post, The New York Times, Slate, The American Prospect, and Time. She was a correspondent for Salon.com in Pakistan after 9/11, and her work appears in numerous other publications, including People, Sports Illustrated for Women, Cosmopolitan, and Women's Health. She has delivered commentary on National Public Radio.

She was a visiting scholar at the Center for Investigative Journalism at Brandeis University. She was a Poynter Fellow at Yale University.

Nomani is the founder and creator of the "Muslim Women's Freedom Tour." She was a lead organizer of the woman-led Muslim prayer in New York City on March 18, 2005, which has been described as "the first mixed-gender prayer on record led by a Muslim woman in 1,400 years." Various mixed-gender prayers have been led privately by a Muslim woman, including a 1998 funeral prayer led by a South African Muslim feminist Shamima Shaikh.

In 2015 a group of Muslim activists, politicians, and writers issued a Declaration of Reform which, among other things, supports women's rights and states in part, "We support equal rights for women, including equal rights to inheritance, witness, work, mobility, personal law, education, and employment. Men and women have equal rights in mosques, boards, leadership and all spheres of society. We reject sexism and misogyny." The Declaration also announced the founding of the Muslim Reform Movement organization to work against the beliefs of Middle Eastern terror groups. In 2015 Nomani and others placed the Declaration on the door of the Islamic Center of Washington.

Nomani has argued in favor of government surveillance programs in the fight against Islamic terrorism, saying that society's "sense of political correctness has kept us from sensible law-enforcement strategies that look at Muslims, mosques, and Islamic organizations." She argues the Muslim community does not do a good job of policing itself and that public areas were "natural meeting spot for criminals." The leader of the American Islamic Forum for Democracy, Zuhdi Jasser, agreed with Nomani's argument that such spying tactics were warranted. Nomani has also argued in favor of "racial and religious profiling," explaining that the "common denominator" of many terrorists with anti-American views is they are Muslim. She reiterated that "the Muslim community [has] failed to police [them]selves" and that such profiling on the basis of "religion, race and ethnicity" is a necessary "part of keeping our skies safe."

On November 11, 2016, on CNN, Nomani revealed that she voted for the Republican candidate Donald Trump, and adding that "liberals and the left have really betrayed America." After Donald Trump signed controversial Executive Order 13769, Nomani supported the decision and stated that referring to the executive order as a "Muslim ban" was a "propaganda campaign" to incite fear in the public.

Nomani is an educational activist. She has opposed critical race theory in education, which she has described as a "divisive ideology".

Influence
In November 2003, Nomani became the first woman in her mosque in West Virginia to insist on the right to pray in the male-only main hall. Her effort brought front-page attention in a New York Times article entitled Muslim Women Seeking a Place in the Mosque. 

Inspired by Michael Muhammad Knight's punk novel The Taqwacores, she organized the first public woman-led prayer of a mixed-gender congregation in the United States, with Amina Wadud leading the prayer. On that day, March 18, 2005, she stated:   We are standing up for our rights as women in Islam. We will no longer accept the back door or the shadows, at the end of the day, we'll be leaders in the Muslim world. We are ushering Islam into the 21st century, reclaiming the voice that the Prophet gave us 1400 years ago.  In his book Blue-Eyed Devil (p. 209), Knight recalls the event as follows:   Inside the chapel there might have been as many reporters and camera crews as there were praying Muslims.  The imam of the day, Amina Wadud, was so distracted by the long rows of popping flash-bulbs that in the middle of the prayer she forgot her ayats.  At the PMU (Progressive Muslim Union)'s first board meeting, Ahmed Nassef would read to us an email from Dr. Wadud that completely washed her hands of the event.  Though she still believed in woman-led prayer, she wanted nothing to do with PMU or Asra Nomani... Wadud had drawn a clear line between the Truth and the media whores, and we knew that PMU was on the wrong side.  To avoid public criticism, PMU's website made no mention of Asra's role in organizing the prayer.  Asra complained of PMU shutting her out. In addition to her books, Nomani has expressed her experiences and ideas for reform in op-eds in The New York Times and in several other publications and broadcasts. She was a friend and colleague of The Wall Street Journal reporter Daniel Pearl, who was staying with her in Karachi with his wife Mariane Pearl when he was abducted and later murdered by Islamic militants in January 2002.

Nomani is portrayed by British actress Archie Panjabi in the film adaptation of Mariane Pearl's book A Mighty Heart. The Washington Post published a review, by Nomani, of the film in which Nomani argued: "...that Danny himself had been cut from his own story."

Nomani is interviewed in a 2005 National Film Board of Canada documentary by Zarqa Nawaz about the efforts of North American Muslim women to be accepted in mosques, entitled Me and the Mosque.

Impact and reception
Regarding the Morgantown mosque issue, Pakistani-American lawyer Asma Gull Hasan, author of Why I Am a Muslim: An American Odyssey, expressed admiration for Nomani, while West Virginia University professor Gamal Fahmy, who claimed that many Muslims believe women should be “isolated as much as possible” to reduce sexual temptation, criticized her and questioned her motives. Others suggest Nomani's woman-led prayer in 2005 led to open discussion and debate about the role of women in Muslim society. Representatives of some Islamic organizations have criticized Nomani on the Morgantown mosque issue, in part because she has openly criticized commonly accepted practices in the American Muslim community, but also for not sufficiently interacting with longstanding Muslim communities.

Works

Books
Standing Alone: An American Woman's Struggle for the Soul of Islam (2005).  (Published in India as Standing Alone in Mecca : A Pilgrimage into the Heart of Islam (2013))
Tantrika: Traveling the Road of Divine Love (2003).

Articles
 "The Woman Who Went To the Front of the Mosque", The Washington Post, 5 June 2005
 "A Gender Jihad For Islam's Future", The Washington Post, 6 November 2005 
 "As Muslim women, we actually ask you not to wear the hijab in the name of interfaith solidarity", The Washington Post, 21 December 2015
 "I’m a Muslim, a woman and an immigrant. I voted for Trump", The Washington Post, 10 November 2016.

Anthologies
 Because I Said So,

References

External links
Official website

Asra Nomani at Podchaser

American newspaper reporters and correspondents
American feminists
American memoirists
1965 births
Living people
American women writers of Indian descent
American women journalists
American writers of Indian descent
Georgetown University faculty
West Virginia University alumni
American University alumni
Indian emigrants to the United States
Writers from Mumbai
American expatriates in Pakistan
20th-century American journalists
21st-century American journalists
20th-century American non-fiction writers
21st-century American non-fiction writers
20th-century American women writers
21st-century American women writers
American women memoirists
Critics of Islamism
American Muslims
Proponents of Islamic feminism
American women academics
The Wall Street Journal people